The Veil is a 2021 South Korean television series starring Namkoong Min, Park Ha-sun, and Kim Ji-eun. Its screenplay, written by Park Seok-ho, won the 2018 MBC Drama Screenplay Contest. It aired from September 17 to October 23, 2021, as the first series on MBC's newly established Fridays and Saturdays at 22:00 (KST) time slot.

A two-part spin-off of the series titled Moebius: The Veil, which was focused on the backstories of Park Ha-sun, Jung Moon-sung and Jang Young-nam's characters, aired on October 29–30, 2021.

Synopsis
It is about a top field agent in the National Intelligence Service (NIS). After going missing a year ago, he returns to the organization to find an internal traitor who dropped him into the abyss.

Cast

Main
 Namkoong Min as Han Ji-hyuk, the best field agent in the NIS who is admired by his colleagues for his shrewd and perfect performance.
 Park Ha-sun as Seo Soo-yeon, Ji-hyuk's co-worker at the NIS and the head of Criminal Information Integration Center.
 Kim Ji-eun as Yoo Je-yi, Ji-hyuk's partner who graduated early from KAIST, and is a promising field agent.

Supporting

Foreign Intelligence Bureau
 Jang Young-nam as Do Jin-sook
  as Kang Pil-ho

Criminal Information Integration Center
 Kim Do-hyun as Ha Dong-gyun
 Park Jin-woo as Cha Min-chul
 Kwon So-hyun as Goo Hyo-eun

Domestic Intelligence Bureau
 Lee Geung-young as Lee In-hwan
  as Jung Yong-tae

Others
 Kim Byung-ki as Bang Young-chan
 Yu Oh-seong as Baek Mo-sa
 Woo Ji-hyun as Wie Goo-pyung
 Hyun Bong-sik as Cheon Myung-gi
 Jung Ji-yoon as Kim Yeo-jin
 Hwang Hee as Oh Kyung-seok
  as Kim Dong-wook
 Ok Ja-yeon as Lin Wei

Extended
 Jung Moon-sung as Jang Chun-woo
 Kim Eun-woo as Pyo Jae-gyu
 Joo Jong-hyuk as Chang-gyu
Ahn Ji-ho as Choi Sang-gyun

Special appearance
 Park Ji-yeon as Jung Eun-hee

Production
The series received a 15 billion won investment from MBC and Wavve for its production. It is labelled as "MBC's 60th anniversary special project".

It was reported that filming started in April 2021 and continued filming for six months until October 21.

Viewership

Awards and nominations

References

External links
  
 
 

MBC TV television dramas
Korean-language television shows
2021 South Korean television series debuts
2021 South Korean television series endings
South Korean action television series
South Korean thriller television series
National Intelligence Service (South Korea) in fiction
Wavve original programming